In military aviation, area bombardment (or area bombing) is a type of aerial bombardment in which bombs are dropped over the general area of a target. The term "area bombing" came into prominence during World War II.

Area bombing is a form of strategic bombing. It can serve several intertwined purposes: to disrupt the production of military materiel, to disrupt lines of communications, to divert the enemy's industrial and military resources from the primary battlefield to air defence and infrastructure repair, and to demoralise the enemy's population (See terror bombing).

"Carpet bombing", also known as "saturation bombing", and "obliteration bombing", refers to a type of area bombing that aims to effect complete destruction of the target area by exploding bombs in every part of it.

Area bombing is contrasted with precision bombing. The latter is directed at a selected target – not necessarily a small, and not necessarily a tactical target, as it could be an airfield or a factory – and it does not intend to inflict a widespread damage.

See also 
 Aerial bombardment and international law
 Aerial bombing of cities
 Civilian casualties of strategic bombing
 Firestorm
 High-level bombing
 Precision-guided munition
 Tactical bombing

References 

Aerial bombing